Airil Rizman, also known as Airil Rizman Zahari,  (born 22 April 1978) is a Malaysian professional golfer.

Rizman was born in Kuala Lumpur. He was the Malaysian national amateur champion in 1998, 1999 and 2001 and a team gold medalist at the 2001 Southeast Asian Games. He was won several titles on the Malaysian PGA Tour, where he topped the order of merit in 2005. He first played on the Asian Tour in 2003, but did not have any top ten finishes through 2006. However, in 2007, he won the first event of the Asian Tour season, the Pakistan Open.

Professional wins (9)

Asian Tour wins (1)

Other wins (8)
8 Malaysian PGA wins

Team appearances
Amateur
Eisenhower Trophy (representing Malaysia): 1998, 2000
Bonallack Trophy (representing Asia/Pacific): 2000

External links

Asian Tour golfers
Malaysian male golfers
Southeast Asian Games medalists in golf
Southeast Asian Games gold medalists for Malaysia
Southeast Asian Games silver medalists for Malaysia
Competitors at the 2001 Southeast Asian Games
Malaysian people of Malay descent
Malaysian Muslims
Sportspeople from Kuala Lumpur
1978 births
Living people